Power in the Blood may refer to:

Power in the Blood (Alabama 3 album), 2002
Power in the Blood (Buffy Sainte-Marie album), 2015